Tommaso de Sarria, O.P. (1606 – 5 November 1682) was a Roman Catholic prelate who served as Archbishop of Taranto (1665–1682) and Archbishop of Trani (1656–1665).

Biography
Tommaso de Sarria was born in Pontevedra, Spain in 1606 and ordained a priest in the Order of Preachers. On 13 March 1654, he was selected as the Archbishop of Trani and confirmed by Pope Innocent X on 16 October 1656. On 13 April 1665, he was appointed during the papacy of Pope Alexander VII as Archbishop of Taranto. He served as Archbishop of Taranto until his death on 5 November 1682.

Episcopal succession

References

External links and additional sources
 (for Chronology of Bishops) 
 (for Chronology of Bishops)  

17th-century Italian Roman Catholic archbishops
Bishops appointed by Pope Alexander VII
Bishops appointed by Pope Innocent X
1606 births
1682 deaths
Archbishops of Trani
People from Pontevedra